Minuscule 160 (in the Gregory-Aland numbering), ε 213 (Soden), is a Greek minuscule manuscript of the New Testament, on parchment. It is dated by its colophon to the year 1123. it has marginalia.

Description 

The codex contains a complete text of the four Gospels on 216 thick parchment leaves (size ). The text is written in one column per page, in 23 lines per page (size of column 15.7 by 10.7 cm), in brown ink, the capital letters in red. It uses "ι adscriptum".

There is also a division according to the Ammonian Sections, (no references to the Eusebian Canons).

Text 

Kurt Aland the Greek text of the codex did not place it in any Category. It is classified to the textual Family 1424. According to the Claremont Profile Method it has mixed text in Luke 1. In Luke 10 and Luke 20 it represents textual family Kx.

History 

The manuscript was housed at the Barberini Palace, founded by the Cardinal, Francis II.

It was examined by Birch (about 1782) and Scholz (1794–1852). C. R. Gregory saw the manuscript in 1886.

It is currently housed at the Vatican Library (Barb. gr. 445), at Rome.

See also 

 List of New Testament minuscules
 Biblical manuscript
 Textual criticism

References

Further reading

External links 
 Minuscule 160 at the Encyclopedia of Textual Criticism

Greek New Testament minuscules
12th-century biblical manuscripts
Manuscripts of the Vatican Library